Anna Sofia Sahlstén (22 September 1859, Iisalmi – 21 August 1931, Helsinki) was a Finnish painter; primarily known for portraits and genre scenes.

Biography

Her father, Clas Vilhelm Sahlstén (1826–1897), was a  who later became a writer. Her mother was Edla Elisabeth Heinricius. When she was eight, her family moved to Helsinki, where she attended a Swedish girls' school; receiving her certificate in 1877. She then studied at the Finnish Society Drawing School from 1877 to 1880, then at a private school operated by Adolf von Becker, from 1880 to 1882.

She went to Paris in 1884, where she studied at the Académie Colarossi, from 1884 to 1885 and after getting a new stipend again in 1889–1890. Her teachers there included Gustave-Claude-Etienne Courtois, Paul-Louis Delance and Jean-André Rixens. During a study trip in 1896, she visited Berlin and St. Petersburg.

She began teaching at the age of twenty-one and worked as a secondary school drawing teacher from 1882 to 1926. She co-founded the Finnish Teachers' Drawing Association in 1906 and acted its first president 1906–1926. She also started the association's own magazine, Stylus.

After she retired from teaching, she wrote a two-act for children called Paimen-Pertti ja prinsessa Priscilla. She also developed a program to help children get food at school. In 1929, she worked on religious paintings at the church in Leppävaara.

Most of her works are folk scenes of people at work, in church or in their home. She later incorporated humorous elements into her work. Her paintings of coffee-drinking grandmothers have been used by the Paulig company, on a brand of coffee named after her.

Selected works

See also
 Golden Age of Finnish Art
 Finnish art

References

 Termonen, Teuvo: Suomalaista postikorttitaidetta (Finnish Postcard Art), Vol.4, pg.109. Suomen Postikorttiyhdistys Apollo, 2006.

External links

 More works by Sahlstén @ ArtNet

1859 births
1931 deaths
People from Iisalmi
Académie Colarossi alumni
Genre painters
Finnish women painters
19th-century Finnish painters
20th-century Finnish painters